Chemiré may refer to several communes in France:
 Chemiré-en-Charnie, in the Sarthe department
 Chemiré-le-Gaudin, in the Sarthe department
 Chemiré-sur-Sarthe, in the Maine-et-Loire department